Juris Štāls (born April 8, 1982) is a Latvian ice hockey player. He currently plays as a right wing for HK Kurbads of Latvian Hockey Higher League. He was drafted in the ninth round (269th overall) of the 2001 NHL Entry Draft by the New York Rangers. He has also played for the Latvian national ice hockey team at the 2014 Winter Olympics.

Playing career 
He started his career in 1999, when he joined the Lukko junior team, and played there for two seasons. In 2001, the New York Rangers drafted him 269th overall, and he went to North America to play for Sarnia Sting in the Ontario Hockey League (OHL). In 2002-03 he mostly played with the Owen Sound Attack of the OHL, and for Vaasan Sport, plus two games for the Hartford Wolf Pack of the American Hockey League (AHL). In 2003-04, he continued to play for Hartford, but from 2004 to 2006 he played for New York Rangers affiliate Charlotte Checkers of the ECHL.

In 2006, he returned to Europe to play for Torpedo Nizhny Novgorod in the Russian Hockey League. Later he played for Ocelari Trinec in the Czech Extraliga, Neman Grodno in the Belarusian Extraleague and HK Riga 2000 in the Latvian Hockey League.

From 2009 to 2012, Juris played 59 games for Dinamo Riga of the Kontinental Hockey League (KHL). He started the 2012-13 season with Kompanion Kiev of the Ukrainian Hockey League, but ended the season with HK Poprad of the Slovak Extraliga.

Career statistics

Regular season and playoffs

International

References

External links

 
 
 
 

1982 births
Living people
Charlotte Checkers (1993–2010) players
Dinamo Riga players
HK Poprad players
Latvian expatriate ice hockey people
Ice hockey players at the 2014 Winter Olympics
Latvian ice hockey right wingers
New York Rangers draft picks
Olympic ice hockey players of Latvia
Ice hockey people from Riga
Torpedo Nizhny Novgorod players
Vaasan Sport players
Latvian expatriate sportspeople in Russia
Latvian expatriate sportspeople in Finland
Latvian expatriate sportspeople in Canada
Latvian expatriate sportspeople in the United States
Latvian expatriate sportspeople in Slovakia
Latvian expatriate sportspeople in Belarus
Latvian expatriate sportspeople in Ukraine
Latvian expatriate sportspeople in the Czech Republic
Expatriate ice hockey players in Russia
Expatriate ice hockey players in Finland
Expatriate ice hockey players in Canada
Expatriate ice hockey players in the United States
Expatriate ice hockey players in Slovakia
Expatriate ice hockey players in Belarus
Expatriate ice hockey players in Ukraine
Expatriate ice hockey players in the Czech Republic